Silene campanulata is a species of flowering plant in the family Caryophyllaceae known by the common names Red Mountain catchfly and bell catchfly. It may be a synonym of Silene greenei.

It is native to the mountains of Oregon and northern California, where it grows in forest and chaparral habitat, sometimes on serpentine soils.

Description
Silene campanulata is a perennial herb growing up to 40 centimeters tall with many small shoots coming from a woody, branching caudex with a taproot. The erect stems are usually hairy and often have glandular, sticky patches on their upper parts. The leaves are up to 5 centimeters long by 3 wide, the lower ones lance-shaped to rounded, and the upper ones linear or oval.

Nodding flowers occur in a terminal cyme at the top of the stem, as well as in some of the leaf axils. Each has a hairy, often glandular calyx of fused sepals. This bell-shaped green or purplish calyx is open at the top, revealing five white, greenish, or pale pink petals. The petals have multilobed or fringed tips. The stamens and three long styles protrude from the flower's center.

Subspecies
Subspecies include: 
Silene campanulata ssp. campanulata — Red Mountain catchfly; endemic to California; designated as endangered under the California Endangered Species Act.
Silene campanulata ssp. glandulosa — Bell catchfly, in California and Oregon.
Silene campanulata subsp. greenei — Greene's catchfly, in California and Oregon.

References

External links

Jepson Manual Treatment
USDA Plants Profile
Flora of North America
Photo gallery

campanulata
Flora of California
Flora of Oregon
Flora of the Klamath Mountains
Natural history of the California chaparral and woodlands
Natural history of the California Coast Ranges
Flora without expected TNC conservation status